Zdzisław Skupień (born November 27, 1938 in Świlcza, Poland) is a Polish mathematician, expert in optimization, discrete mathematics, and graph theory, professor, dr. hab. (1982).

In 1964 Skupień introduced the concept of "locally Hamiltonian graphs".

In 1976 Skupień introduced the concept of "homogeneously traceable graphs".

Skupień authored over 140 publications.

Awards
1998: Medal of the  Commission for National Education (Medal Komisji Edukacji Narodowej) 
1988: Order of Polonia Restituta (Krzyż Kawalerski Orderu Odrodzenia Polski)
1983: Cross of Merit (Złoty Krzyż Zasługi)

References

1938 births
Living people
Polish mathematicians
Recipients of the Order of Polonia Restituta